Air France Flight 343 was a scheduled international passenger flight from  Paris, France, to Abidjan, Ivory Coast, with scheduled stopovers at Dakar, Senegal and Monrovia, Liberia.  The aircraft crashed into the Atlantic Ocean around 06:50 on 29 August 1960 while attempting to land at Yoff Airport, Dakar.  All 55 passengers and 8 crew were killed.

Aircraft and flight 
Air France Flight 343 was a scheduled passenger service from Paris, France, to Abidjan, Ivory Coast.  It made scheduled stopovers at Dakar, Senegal and Monrovia, Liberia.  On the day of the incident the aircraft flying the route was a Lockheed 1049G Super Constellation with registration F-BHBC.  This aircraft had first flown in 1955 and had recorded 16,417 flight hours.

Incident 
The aircraft approached Yoff Airport, Dakar, in low overcast conditions just before sunrise on 29 August 1960. There were rain squalls and thunderstorms.  

The pilot attempted to land the aircraft on runway 01 but aborted this attempt. The pilot was offered an instrument landing system landing on runway 30 but declined and entered a holding pattern, hoping that weather conditions improved. Shortly after 06:41 the pilot started a second landing approach on runway 01. The landing was aborted at 06:47 and the aircraft overflew the airport. Shortly afterwards the aircraft entered a rain squall.

It struck the water at a steep angle and probably while banking to the right. All 55 passengers and 8 crew on board were killed, including the French West African poet David Diop.

Investigation and aftermath 
A salvage attempt was made and, although most of the bodies were recovered, only 20 per cent of the wreckage was brought back to shore. The Bureau of Enquiry and Analysis for Civil Aviation Safety investigated but could not determine the cause of the crash. It proposed a number of possibilities: a structural failure or loss of control caused by turbulence; a sensory illusion; distraction of the flight crew, possibly by a lightning strike; failure of an airspeed indicator or altimeter or faulty reading thereof.

A number of cases were brought against Air France for compensation under the Warsaw Convention by the families of the victims, including by Diop's widow.  The Diop case was decided in 1964 at the Tribunal de grande instance de Seine, it was appealed to the Court of Appeal of Paris.  The decision was made to award the basic level of compensation but not that Air France was particularly negligent.  The court found the pilot, who had been earlier punished by Air France for recklessness, had continued to land without use of instruments in bad weather, amounting to wilful misconduct.

References

External links 
Final report on the investigation into the crash, published in the Journal Officiel on 10 September 1963

Aviation accidents and incidents in 1960
Aviation accidents and incidents in Senegal
Accidents and incidents involving the Lockheed Constellation
1960 in Senegal
Air France accidents and incidents
Airliner accidents and incidents with an unknown cause